Moonshiners is an American docudrama television series on the Discovery Channel produced by Magilla Entertainment that dramatizes the life of people who produce (illegal) moonshine in the Appalachian Mountains of Kentucky, North Carolina, South Carolina, Tennessee, and Virginia. The series dramatizes their liquor production efforts, law-evading techniques and life.
There have been claims by local officials that the show is not what it portrays itself to be. Virginia authorities have stated that no illegal liquor is actually being produced by the people depicted in the show. The Virginia Department of Alcoholic Beverage Control (ABC) said in March 2012 that, "If illegal activity was actually taking place, the Virginia ABC Bureau of Law Enforcement would have taken action." They also said that they had requested for the producers to add a disclaimer to clarify that the show was only a dramatization, "but the request was overlooked", and the show's producers, Magilla Entertainment, have stated their documentary content is real.

Portions of the show that feature Marvin "Popcorn" Sutton were taken from a documentary film by Neal Hutcheson. Hutcheson's documentary was filmed in 2002 and released the same year with the title This is the Last Dam Run of Likker I'll Ever Make. In 2008, a version of the documentary that was edited for television was broadcast on PBS and the Documentary Channel with the title The Last One, and it received a Southeast Emmy Award in 2009. Sutton was arrested in 2007 by ATF agents in Cocke County, Tennessee (led by Jim Cavanaugh of Waco siege fame) for illegally distilling liquor and possession of a handgun by a felon, and was sentenced to eighteen months in jail in 2009. He subsequently died by suicide, apparently to avoid serving the federal prison term.

The show's first season premiered on December 6, 2011.

The twelfth season premieres on November 9, 2022, with a preseason special airing on November 2, 2022.

Series overview

Cast
Key:  indicates a season in which a person appeared

Spinoffs

Tickle

In May 2013, it was announced that, in addition to renewing Moonshiners for a third season, Discovery Channel would be purchasing a spinoff about Steven Ray Tickle, to be called Tickle. The series premiered on August 13, 2013.

Moonshiners: Whiskey Business

In February 2019, a new series titled Moonshiners: Whiskey Business was announced through Discovery Channel. The spinoff sprouted from a Moonshiners season seven special titled Whiskey Business, in which Tim Smith travels to help out struggling Missouri Ridge Distillery and keep them in business. The special proved successful and four more episodes were made to air at the end of Moonshiners' season 8. The spin-off started airing March 13, 2019.

Moonshiners: Master Distiller
A new Moonshiners series titled Moonshiners: Master Distiller premiered on March 3, 2020 on Discovery Channel.

Theme song and introduction sequence
The theme song for the show is Steve Earle's "Copperhead Road".  The intro montage introduces the cast members, and also shows some of the difficulties they face while making the moonshine.
Since season 5, the theme song has been Bleeding Fingers' "Livin' Outside the Law".

References

External links
 
 
Moonshiner Josh Owens official website

Discovery Channel original programming
Works about Appalachia
Television shows set in Virginia
Television shows set in North Carolina
Television shows set in South Carolina
2011 American television series debuts
2010s American reality television series
Moonshine in popular culture